Choi Jae-Sung (born November 18, 1964) is a South Korean actor. Choi debuted with KBS TV drama series, Diary of a High School Student in 1984. Choi entered stardom through The Tree Blooming with Love and Lee Jang-ho's Baseball Team.

Filmography

*Note; the whole list is referenced.

TV
 1987, The Tree Blooming with Love (Sarang-i kkotpineun namu 사랑이 꽃피는 나무)
 1991, Eyes of Dawn (Yeomyeong-ui nundongja 여명의 눈동자)
 1997, Desire (Yeokmang 욕망)
 1998, Gamer (Seungbusa 승부사)
 1998,  War And Love (Jeonjaeng-gwa sarang 전쟁과 사랑)
 2000, Sound of Thunder (Cheondung sori 천둥소리)
 2000, Love and Farewell (Sarang-gwa ibyeol 사랑과 이별)
 2002, The Dawn of the Empire (Jeguk-ui achim 제국의 아침)
 2002, Rustic Period (Yain sidae 야인시대)
 2004, Jang Gil-san (Jang Gil-san 장길산)
 2004, Immortal Admiral Yi Sun-sin (Bulmyeol-ui I Sun-sin 불멸의 이순신)
 2006, Yeon Gaesomun (Yeon Gaesomun 연개소문)
 2007, Time Between Dog and Wolf (Gae-wa neukdae-ui sigan 개와 늑대의 시간)
 2009, Empress Cheonchu (Cheonchu Taehu 천추태후)
 2010, The Great Merchant (Geosang Kim Man-deok 거상 김만덕)
 2012, Dream of the Emperor (General Gyebaek)일반계백장군
 2017, Revolutionary Love (Byun Kang-soo)
 2018, Sunny Again Tomorrow (Park Jin-guk)
 2019, Designated Survivor: 60 Days (Lee Gwan-mook)
 2023, Woman in a Veil (Jung Hyeon-tae)

Awards
1986 25th Grand Bell Awards : New Actor (이장호의 외인구단)
1986 22nd Baeksang Arts Awards : New TV Actor (별을 좇는 야생마, KBS)
1992 28th Baeksang Arts Awards : Best TV Actor (여명의 눈동자, MBC)
2014 KBS Drama Awards : Excellence Award, Actor in a Daily Drama (Single-minded Dandelion)

References

External links
 

1964 births
Male actors from Seoul
South Korean male film actors
South Korean male television actors
Living people
Best New Actor Paeksang Arts Award (television) winners
Jae-sung